Third Law is the third album by British electronic music producer Roly Porter. It was released on 22 January 2016 by Tri Angle. The album received positive reviews from music critics. "4101" was released as the first single from the album.

Reception

Accolades

Track listing

References

External links
Third Law at Bandcamp

Dubstep albums
2016 albums